Walker County is a county located in the northwestern part of the U.S. state of Georgia. As of the 2020 census, the population was 67,654, down from 68,756 in 2010. The county seat is LaFayette. The county was created on December 18, 1833, from land formerly belonging to the Cherokee Indian Nation.

Walker County is part of the Chattanooga TN/GA Metropolitan Statistical Area.

History
Walker County was named after Georgia's U.S. Senator, Freeman Walker (1780–1827).

Civil War battles fought in Walker County were part of the Chickamauga Campaign fought between August 21 and September 20, 1863:
 Second Battle of Chattanooga, August 21.
 Battle of Davis's Cross Roads, September 10–11.
 Battle of Chickamauga, September 19–20.

In 2002 the Tri-State Crematory scandal in Noble came to national attention when 339 bodies that were consigned to be cremated were discovered on the property. The owner, Ray Brent Marsh, was convicted of several charges and sentenced to twelve years in prison.

Geography
The northern two-thirds of Walker County is located in the Middle Tennessee-Chickamauga sub-basin of the Middle Tennessee-Hiwassee basin. Most of the southeastern portion of the county is located in the Oostanaula River sub-basin in the ACT River Basin (Coosa-Tallapoosa River Basin), with a very small southeastern sliver located in the Conasauga River sub-basin in the larger ACT River Basin. The rest of the southern portion of Walker County is located in the Upper Coosa River sub-basin in the ACT River Basin.

Adjacent counties

 Hamilton County, Tennessee - north
 Catoosa County - northeast
 Whitfield County - east
 Gordon County - southeast
 Floyd County - south
 Chattooga County - south
 DeKalb County, Alabama - southwest/CST Border
 Dade County - west

Natural attractions and features
 Chattahoochee National Forest (part)
 Chickamauga and Chattanooga National Military Park (part)
 Ellison's Cave (12th deepest cave in the United States)
 Lookout Mountain (part)
 McLemore Cove
 Petty John's Cave
 Pigeon Mountain
 Rocktown
 Rock City
 Lula Lake Land Trust

Government and politics

As of 2020, Walker County was one of only nine counties in the United States still employing the sole commissioner form of government. Georgia is the last remaining state that allows sole commissioners. In a 2018 referendum, Walker County voters approved with an 80% margin a transition to a five-member board of commissioners, consisting of four commissioners elected by district and a chairperson. The first members of the board were elected in November 2020 and took office in January 2021 with Districts 1 and 2 commissioners serving an initial 2-year term and Districts 3 and 4 commissioners and the chairperson serving an initial 4-year term. From 2022, every commissioner will serve 4 year terms, therefore ensuring that half the commission is up for reelection every 2 years. The commission meets in LaFayette, the county seat.

The commissioners of each district represent the following areas:
District 1: Rossville  
District 2: Chickamauga
District 3: LaFayette
District 4: Lookout Mountain

Transportation

Major highways

  U.S. Route 27
  U.S. Route 27 Business
  State Route 1
  State Route 1 Business
  State Route 2
  State Route 95
  State Route 136
  State Route 151
  State Route 157
  State Route 189
  State Route 193
  State Route 201
  State Route 337
  State Route 341

Railroads

Current
 Chattooga and Chickamauga Railway
 Tennessee Valley Railroad Museum (occasional tourist excursions)

Defunct
 Chattanooga Southern Railway (became Tennessee, Alabama and Georgia Railway)
 Tennessee, Alabama and Georgia Railway (merged into Southern Railway, then abandoned )
 Chickamauga and Durham Railroad (merged into Chattanooga & Durham)
 Chattanooga and Durham Railroad (merged by Chattanooga, Rome and Southern)
 Chattanooga, Rome and Southern Railroad (merged into Central of GA Railway)
 Central of Georgia Railway (merged into Southern Railway)
 Southern Railway  (merged into Norfolk Southern, Walker County line transferred to State of Georgia, leased to Chattooga and Chickamauga Railway)

Demographics

2000 census
As of the census of 2000, there were 61,053 people, 23,605 households, and 17,467 families living in the county. There were 25,577 housing units at an average density of 57 per square mile (22/km2). The racial makeup of the county was 94.43% White, 3.78% Black or African American, 0.29% Native American, 0.28% Asian, 0.02% Pacific Islander, 0.36% from other races, and 0.84% from two or more races.  0.93% of the population were Hispanic or Latino of any race.

Of the 23,605 households, out of which 32.60% had children under the age of 18 living with them, 57.80% were married couples living together, 12.00% had a female householder with no husband present, and 26.00% were non-families. 22.90% of all households were made up of individuals, and 10.40% had someone living alone who was 65 years of age or older.  The average household size was 2.54 and the average family size was 2.98.  The median age was 37 years.

The county's population age groups were spread out, with 24.80% under the age of 18, 8.70% from 18 to 24, 28.80% from 25 to 44, 23.90% from 45 to 64, and 13.80% who were 65 years of age or older.  For every 100 females, there were 94.40 males.  For every 100 females age 18 and over, there were 90.90 males.

The median income for a household in the county was $32,406, and the median income for a family was $39,034. Males had a median income of $29,448 versus $21,583 for females. The per capita income for the county was $15,867.  About 10.00% of families and 12.50% of the population were below the poverty line, including 17.10% of those under age 18 and 11.70% of those age 65 or over.

2010 census
As of the 2010 United States Census, there were 68,756 people, 26,497 households, and 18,898 families living in the county. The racial makeup of the county was 93.0% white, 4.1% black or African American, 0.4% Asian, 0.3% American Indian, 0.6% from other races, and 1.6% from two or more races. Those of Hispanic or Latino origin made up 1.6% of the population. In terms of ancestry, 25.9% were American, 15.3% were Irish, 11.2% were English, and 9.3% were German.

Of the 26,497 households, 33.8% had children under the age of 18 living with them, 53.1% were married couples living together, 13.1% had a female householder with no husband present, 28.7% were non-families, and 24.7% of all households were made up of individuals. The average household size was 2.54 and the average family size was 3.01. The median age was 39.7 years.

The county's population age groups were spread out, with 23.6% under the age of 18, 5.3% from 20 to 24, 25.8% from 25 to 44, 27.8% from 45 to 64, and 15% who were 65 years of age or older.  The gender ratio of the county's population was 50.9% female versus 49.1% male.

The median income for a household in the county was $38,723 and the median income for a family was $46,307. Males had a median income of $38,297 versus $29,285 for females. The per capita income for the county was $19,440. About 11.6% of families and 15.1% of the population were below the poverty line, including 20.0% of those under age 18 and 8.1% of those age 65 or over.

2020 census

As of the 2020 United States census, there were 67,654 people, 26,760 households, and 17,810 families residing in the county.

Communities

Cities
 Chickamauga
 Fort Oglethorpe (small portion only)
 LaFayette (county seat)
 Lookout Mountain
 Rossville

Census-designated places
 Chattanooga Valley
 Fairview
 Lakeview
 Rock Spring

Unincorporated communities
 Flintstone
 High Point
 Hinkles
 Kensington
 Naomi
 Villanow
 East Armuchee

Politics

See also

 National Register of Historic Places listings in Walker County, Georgia
 Northwest Georgia Joint Development Authority
List of counties in Georgia

References

External links 
 City of Chickamauga
 City of LaFayette
 City of Rossville
 City of Lookout Mountain, Ga.
 Walker County Messenger
 WQCH Radio
 Walker County, GA, genealogy
 Walker County, GA | Official Government

 
Georgia (U.S. state) counties
1833 establishments in Georgia (U.S. state)
Populated places established in 1833
Chattanooga metropolitan area counties
Northwest Georgia (U.S.)
Counties of Appalachia